Becky Kelso (born August 1948) is an American politician who served in the Minnesota House of Representatives from 1987 to 1999.

References

1948 births
Living people
Democratic Party members of the Minnesota House of Representatives